Music of Quality and Distinction Volume Three is the final album released by the British Electric Foundation, released in 2013. The album took 22 years to complete.

References

2013 albums
British Electric Foundation albums
Music in Sheffield